Meyrick Chapman (9 December 1886 – 29 December 1969) was a British athlete. Educated at Magdalen College School, he competed at the 1908 Summer Olympics in London. In the 100 metres, Chapman took second place in his first round heat with a time of 11.3 seconds.  He did not advance to the semifinals.

He was the winner of the British Olympic 100 m trials and competed for Finchley Harriers. Chapman was still competing at a relatively high level in 1924, winning the 100 yards at the Bucks AAA championship.

References

Sources
 
 
 

1886 births
1969 deaths
Athletes (track and field) at the 1908 Summer Olympics
Olympic athletes of Great Britain
British male sprinters
People educated at Magdalen College School, Brackley